Való Világ 8, also known as Való Világ powered by Big Brother, is the eighth season of the Hungarian reality television series Való Világ aired by RTL II. It is the first season based on the Big Brother license. It started on 27 August 2016.

Bence Istenes and Anikó Nádai as the main hosts, Győző Gáspár and Való Világ 6 winner Aurelio co-host the spin-off show BeleValóvilág powered by Big Brother.

Villa residents

Nominations table 
 – Immune 
 – Walked
 – Evicted

Weekly themes
Daddy-mommy week

 - Winner

Hierarchy week

Hotel week

 - Employee of the Week

Media week

The villa residents were given the task, that they can write a tabloid newspaper Villafirka about what happening in the house. The three editor in chief: Mici, Evelin, and Lóri formed 3 groups and every day other team was edited the newspaper.

Circus week

 - The best pair

Eco week

This week, the villa residents got the task that they can produce electricity with a bike, because they shut off the electricity and hot water supply.

School week

This week the villa residents got 'School week' where they had lessons from history, grammar and literature, PE, geography and math. In the end of the week each villa resident had exam. The best student was Soma. His prize was a video message from his family.

Media week

This week the villa residents got the task, that they can make the show and give tasks for the other villa residents.

 The best pair

References

External links 
 Official site

2016 Hungarian television seasons